Francis Joseph Lapp (born 1958) is an Alsatian French electrical engineer and entrepreneur active in France, Luxembourg and Poland. Originally French, he obtained Polish citizenship in 2014. He is the owner and chief executive officer of Sunreef Yachts, a luxury catamaran shipyard located in the former Gdańsk Shipyard in Gdańsk, Poland. Throughout his career he also led or owned numerous other companies.

Biography 
Francis Lapp was born in a small town near Mulhouse in the French region of Alsace. Initially working for France-based multinational corporations, he spent a couple of years in Saudi Arabia working on construction of hospitals there. In the late 1980s Lapp quit his job and started a small company producing switchgear cubicles for Siemens and Coca-Cola, among other clients. A race car driver in his free time, in 1991 Lapp visited Poland for the first time to take part in one of Polish Automobile and Motorcycle Association's "Off-Road Championship of Poland" rally raids.

Soon afterwards he returned to Poland, this time looking for business opportunities. At the time France was slowly recovering from decades of stagnation, while economy of Poland was undergoing a shock therapy dubbed the Balcerowicz Plan, which would soon lead to GDP growth rates exceeding 6%. This, coupled with lower wages and a skilled workforce, made Poland of the 1990s attract much foreign investment. In 1992 Francis Lapp settled in Poland for good. There he launched HTEP Polska, initially as a switchgear producer. With time the company started designing and installing electrical, air-conditioning and sanitary systems for industrial facilities, but also Castorama DIY shops, Carrefour hypermarkets, Grand Hotel in Sopot, BSH Hausgeräte facilities in Łódź and Emporio Armani boutique in Warsaw, among others.

In the 1990s Lapp became an active sailor and took part in the 1996 Polish Hobie Cat Championships, finishing sixth in the Hobie 16 class. In 1998 or 2000 he visited the Salon nautique international de Paris in order to buy a similar racing catamaran for himself, but instead bought three cruising catamarans, transported them to Madagascar and founded Sunreef Charter, a France-based yacht charter company His son Nicolas also owned a travel agency specialising in luxurious yachts.

In 2000 they decided to start building yachts themselves, instead of buying them from other shipyards. Francis Lapp leased 6000 square metres of recently closed-down Gdańsk Shipyard and started Sunreef Yachts, the first shipyard in Poland specialising in catamaran construction. The first vessel, a 22.5-metre catamaran designed by Van Peteghem Lauriot-Prévost, was launched on 25 July 2003, its godmother was Anna Maria Jopek, a popular Polish singer. It took roughly two years to find a buyer for the first vessel, but eventually the business took off. The second vessel, a 70-footer in the Power 70 class, was bought by a renowned Swiss sailor Laurent Bourgnon. In 2005 the company had 130 employees, by 2013 the number rose to 450. Apart from selling yachts, the company also offers yacht chartering services.

Despite the financial crisis of 2007–08 that forced many other luxury yachts producers into bankruptcy, Lapp's company continued to grow. However, in January 2011 Sunreef's premises, along with three catamarans under construction, were destroyed by a fire caused most likely by a chemical reaction in a tank containing a mixture of industrial hardener with resin. Eventually Lapp decided to rebuild the shipyard in Gdańsk, in spite of incentives to move the company elsewhere.

Today, both sailing and power Sunreef catamarans, are cruising worldwide and spreading the unique Sunreef touch around the globe.

Lapps company is now the world leader in the design and construction of large, customized luxury catamarans, exhibiting at the most important yacht shows including Cannes, Monaco, Miami, Fort Lauderdale, Dubai, Qatar or Singapore.

Francis Lapp is also co-founder of the design of a new range of sail and power catamarans inspired with both classics and modern marine architecture.

In 2013, 2014, 2016 and 2018 Lapp organized the "Pomorskie Rendez–Vous" an event fostered by Mieczysław Struk – Marshal of the Pomeranian voivodship and Pawel Adamowicz – Mayor of Gdansk. The event was created in order to promote luxury brands in Poland.

Awards 
 Entrepreneur of the Year – World Yacht Trophies 2013
 Best Exporter in the Awards "Ambasador Polskiej Gospodarki" – Business Centre Club

References

Bibliography 
 
 
 
 
 
 
 
 
 
 
 
 
 

French chief executives
French company founders
French sailors
1958 births
Living people